The Asian Mile Challenge is a series of four one-mile (eight furlongs) Thoroughbred horse races. Created in 2005, the series was launched with two races, one in Hong Kong, the other in Japan. In 2006, the Melbourne Racing Club of Australia  and the Dubai Racing Club of the United Arab Emirates joined the series.

Raced approximately four weeks apart between March and June, a US$1 million bonus is given to any horse who wins two legs of the  Asian Mile Challenge. In 2006, the Hong Kong-based horse Bullish Luck collected the bonus after winning the Champions Mile and the Yasuda Kinen.

The Asian Mile Challenge now consists of four Grade I races:
 Futurity Stakes at Caulfield Racecourse, Melbourne
 Dubai Duty Free Stakes at Meydan Racecourse in Dubai
 Champions Mile at Sha Tin Racecourse, Hong Kong
 Yasuda Kinen at Tokyo Racecourse, Tokyo

References
 Dubai World Cup press release regarding Asian Mile Challenge
 Asian Mile Challenge official website (multiple languages)

Racing series for horses
Horse races in Australia
Horse races in the United Arab Emirates
International sports competitions hosted by Hong Kong
Horse races in Hong Kong
Horse races in Japan